Flower Girl is a 2013 Nigerian romantic comedy film set and shot in Lagos, Nigeria. It revolves around the story of Kemi (Damilola Adegbite) who wants to marry Umar (Chris Attoh), a young man who is desperate to get ahead in his career. When their relationship hits troubled waters, Kemi seeks the help of movie superstar Tunde (Blossom Chukwujekwu) and they hatch a plan to get Kemi what she wants.

Plot
Kemi, working in her parents’ flower shop, dreams of becoming one of the happily married couples she sees every day. Her longtime lawyer boyfriend Umar has promised to marry her when he gets a promotion, but she is growing impatient. Still living with her parents, she spends her nights in her room planning the wedding she hopes to have someday. When Umar gets a promotion, she expects a big proposal, but Umar breaks up with her instead. Devastated, she goes on a delivery, and unable to see where she is going through tears of grief, is hit by a car. The driver turns out to be Tunde Kulani, a famous Nollywood movie star.

While Tunde tends to her wounds, Kemi breaks down and tells him about her dilemma. Tunde offers to help her get Umar to propose. Together they devise a plan: they will pretend to be a couple to make Umar jealous and get him back.

Cast
As with Small Boy, Bello brought new faces to the secondary roles and decided to mix the main cast with up-and-coming young actors. For most of them, including TV star Damilola Adegbite, it was their first time acting in a Nigerian feature film. They had to get used to the director’s unique style and techniques during their weeks of rehearsal.

Main Cast
 Damilola Adegbite as Kemi Williams, a young romantic florist who works for her parents while constantly dreaming of her perfect wedding day.
 Chris Attoh as Umar Abubakar, Kemi’s long-time boyfriend. He's an ambitious young lawyer, anxious to rapidly climb the ladder in the law firm where he works.
 Blossom Chukwujekwu as Tunde Kulani, the hot Nollywood film star. The decision to cast Chukwujekwu in this role was unanimous. Chukwujekwu said that he was attracted to the movie's message and how it was written.
 Eku Edewor as Sapphire, Tunde’s on-and-off sexy, vixen girlfriend who blackmails Tunde without any hesitation.
 Bikiya Graham-Douglas as Stella, Kemi’s quirky, outrageous best friend. Says Graham-Douglas, "Stella is energetic, flamboyant, unapologetic, full of life and she’s very caring....". Says Bello, "Graham-Douglas was a ball of energy on set".

Supporting Cast
Patrick Doyle as Kemi’s eccentric father, Mr. Williams.
Teni Aofiyebi as Mrs. Ada, the queen of the tabloid industry.
Tosan Edremoda-Ugbeye as Funke Williams, Kemi’s sweet, loving mother.
Ahide Adum as Tunde’s wealthy father and agent, Sule Kulani.
Grace Agu as Taiwo, a snooty sales assistant
Angela Adiele as Morenike, the second snobbish sales assistant
Jude Orhorha as Mr. Odo, Umar’s boss in the law firm

Production
Michelle Bello developed the initial rough script for the film while studying for her master's degree in Communications at Regent University in Virginia, United States. The class was asked to write a full-length feature film script, which she had never done before. She gave a lot of thought to the story she would want to write about; one that would be exciting enough to develop into a ninety-page script.

She says; "I loved watching romantic comedies. I’ve always been a romantic at heart and I could often relate to the main characters and their experiences. I wanted to take this genre and adapt it to a modern day movie set in Lagos, Nigeria. I wanted to explore a whole range of colorful characters - both their good sides and their bad sides because at the end of the day, no one is perfect."

Bello wrote the first draft of Flower Girl, which was originally called Caught Up, in the short period of two months. She added issues occurring in relationships of young couples today in Nigerian society making it relatable for the young audiences.

"I remember my screenwriting professor really liked the first draft of the script because he gave me an A, so I was really happy. Back then, I never really thought of it as my second feature film. It was only when trying to come up with some ideas with my brother who wrote the final script that I realized that this script would be great to shoot back home as it had an international theme and crossover appeal," says Bello.

Screenwriter Jigi Bello says Flower Girl was a unique opportunity to create a cinematic world that would appeal to audiences in his country. He says As a Nigerian, it was exciting to explore the characters in the new quickly emerging middle class. It starts with a real group of characters you would meet on a Lagos street: the romantic, the playboy, the businessman, the mentor, and through a twist of fate allow them to discover each other.

"The fun for me as a writer and where the comedy comes from is the honesty of these characters to their own beliefs, no matter how crazy the situation. I hope others enjoy the story as much as I did," adds Bello.

Co-Producer Michelle Dede says, Producing a film, especially in Nigeria, is not the easiest thing to do. It was very rewarding because of the experience of being on a film set and all the little things that go into making a movie possible.

Music
Music was composed by Hitplay. Several additional songs include:

 "Ma Se Yen" - performed by Lesoul
 "Falling for You" - performed by Kaline
 "Fine Lady" - performed by Lynxxx
 "Best In Me" - performed by Efya

Release

The world premiere of Flower Girl took place on 13 February 2013 in Lagos, Nigeria. It went on general release in Nigeria on Valentine’s Day 2013 and received mixed critical reviews. The film was the number one box office hit that weekend in Lagos. The Ghana premiere subsequently took place on 5 May 2013 in Accra and on the first night had to be shown in an additional cinema hall due to the large number of people there who had anxiously awaited the arrival of the movie in their country.

The UK premiere was held on 26 September 2013 at the Odeon Cinema in Greenwich. Talking Drum Entertainment UK distributed a new edited version of the romantic comedy on Friday, 4 October 2013 in selected Odeon, Vue, Cineworld and independent cinemas.

Flower Girl was also screened at the Hollywood Black Film Festival 2013 and had its US premiere at the festival screening in Los Angeles on 3 October 2013.

It was released on Netflix on 13 July 2021.

Reception 
The movie received praise for its cinematography and weave of romance and comedy. It was however criticized for poor sound design and limited musical choice.

Awards

See also
 List of Nigerian films of 2013

References

External links 

Flower girl on Facebook
Flower girl on Twitter
Blu Star Entertainment Limited

2013 films
Nigerian romantic comedy films
English-language Nigerian films
Films shot in Lagos
Films set in Lagos
2013 romantic comedy films
2010s English-language films
Films shot in Nigeria